The LNB Pro A, currently known for sponsorship reasons as Betclic Élite, is the top-tier men's professional basketball league in France. The competition has existed since 1921. Since 1987, the Ligue Nationale de Basket has governed the league. The bottom two placed teams from each season are relegated to the second tier level Pro B. The winner of the play-offs of the Pro A is crowned the French national champion.

Competition format
All 16 Pro A League teams play each other twice during the regular season. At the end of the regular season, the top eight teams qualify for the playoffs. The two teams with the worst regular season records are relegated to the 2nd-tier Pro B.

Through the 1985–86 season, the league championship was determined by a one-off final, or solely by league play. Since then, the format for the league finals has changed many times:

 1987–1992: Best-of-3 series
 1993: Best-of-5
 1994: Best-of-3
 1995–1996: Best-of-5
 1997–2004: Best-of-3
 2005–2012: Single match (at Palais Omnisports de Paris-Bercy in Paris)
 2013–present: Best-of-5
 2021 only: Single match due to COVID-19 issues

From the 2003–04 season, through the 2006–07 season, the Pro A League had 18 teams. Through the wild-card system, it will have 18 teams again from 2014–15 season. From the 2023–24 season, the league will be reduced to 16 teams.

Current teams

Arena rules
Currently, LNB Pro A clubs must play in arenas that seat at least 3,000 people.

French League history
 1920–21 to 1948–49  Excellence
 1949–50 to 1962–63  Nationale
 1963–64 to 1964–65  Première Division
 1965–66 to 1986–87  Nationale 1
 1987–88 to 1991–92  Nationale 1A
 1992–93 Nationale A1
 1993–94 to 2017–18 Pro A
 2017–18 to 2020–21 Jeep Élite (title sponsorship took effect in the later stages of the 2017–18 season)
2021–22 to present: Betclic Elite

Title holders 

 1920–21: Stade Français
 1921–22: Lille
 1922–23: École Normale Arras
 1923–24: FAM
 1924–25: FAM
 1925–26: FAM
 1926–27: Stade Français
 1927–28: FAM
 1928–29: FAM
 1929–30: FAM
 1930–31: FAM
 1931–32: CAUFA Reims
 1932–33: CAUFA Reims
 1933–34: Olympique Lillois
 1934–35: CAM
 1935–36: SCPO
 1936–37: CAM
 1937–38: SCPO
 1938–39: Métro
 1939–41: Not held due to WWII
 1941–42: Métro
 1942–43: Grenoble
 1943–44: Grenoble
 1944–45: Championnet Sports
 1945–46: ESSMG Lyon
 1946–47: PUC
 1947–48: Union athlétique de Marseille
 1948–49: ASVEL
 1949–50: ASVEL
 1950–51: Racing Club de France
 1951–52: ASVEL
 1952–53: Racing Club de France
 1953–54: Racing Club de France
 1954–55: ASVEL
 1955–56: ASVEL
 1956–57: ASVEL
 1957–58: Étoile Charleville-Mézières
 1958–59: Chorale Mulsant
 1959–60: Étoile Charleville-Mézières
 1960–61: Alsace de Bagnolet
 1961–62: Alsace de Bagnolet
 1962–63: PUC
 1963–64: ASVEL
 1964–65: Denain Voltaire
 1965–66: ASVEL
 1966–67: Alsace de Bagnolet
 1967–68: ASVEL
 1968–69: ASVEL
 1969–70: Olympique Antibes
 1970–71: ASVEL
 1971–72: ASVEL
 1972–73: Berck
 1973–74: Berck
 1974–75: ASVEL
 1975–76: ASPO Tours
 1976–77: ASVEL
 1977–78: Moderne
 1978–79: Moderne
 1979–80: ASPO Tours
 1980–81: ASVEL
 1981–82: Moderne
 1982–83: Limoges CSP
 1983–84: Limoges CSP
 1984–85: Limoges CSP
 1985–86: Orthez
 1986–87: Orthez
 1987–88: Limoges CSP
 1988–89: Limoges CSP
 1989–90: Limoges CSP
 1990–91: Olympique Antibes
 1991–92: Pau-Orthez
 1992–93: Limoges CSP
 1993–94: Limoges CSP
 1994–95: Olympique Antibes
 1995–96: Pau-Orthez
 1996–97: PSG Racing
 1997–98: Pau-Orthez
 1998–99: Pau-Orthez
 1999–00: Limoges CSP
 2000–01: Pau-Orthez
 2001–02: ASVEL
 2002–03: Pau-Orthez
 2003–04: Pau-Orthez
 2004–05: SIG Strasbourg
 2005–06: Le Mans Sarthe
 2006–07: Chorale Roanne
 2007–08: SLUC Nancy
 2008–09: ASVEL
 2009–10: Cholet
 2010–11: SLUC Nancy
 2011–12: Élan Chalon
 2012–13: JSF Nanterre
 2013–14: Limoges CSP
 2014–15: Limoges CSP
 2015–16: ASVEL
 2016–17: Élan Chalon
 2017–18: Le Mans Sarthe
 2018–19: LDLC ASVEL
 2019–20: No championship awarded (COVID-19)
 2020–21: LDLC ASVEL
 2021–22: LDLC ASVEL

Performance by club

Finals

Historical players

  Alexis Ajinça
  David Andersen
  Ron Anderson
  Roger Antoine
  Eddie Basden
  Nicolas Batum
  Rodrigue Beaubois
  Louis Bertorelle
  Éric Beugnot
  Jean-Paul Beugnot
  Jim Bilba
  Yann Bonato
  Bruce Bowen
  Michael Brooks
  Marcus Brown
  André Buffière
  Robert Busnel
  Jacques Cachemire
  Fabien Causeur
  René Chocat
  Don Collins
  Richard Dacoury
  Frederic Forte
  Nando de Colo
  Jean Degros
  Boris Diaw
  Yakhouba Diawara
  Alain Digbeu
  Bobby Dixon
  Maxime Dorigo
  Hervé Dubuisson
  Zaza Enden
  Morris Finley
  Laurent Foirest
  Evan Fournier
  Lawrence Funderburke
  Pierre Galle
  Ken Gardner
  Didier Gadou
  Mickaël Gelabale
  Alain Gilles
  Rudy Gobert
  Henri Grange
   Ricardo Greer
  Udonis Haslem
  Thomas Heurtel
  Edwin Jackson
  Keith Jennings
  Cyril Julian
  İlkan Karaman
  Frank Kendrick
  Tarence Kinsey
  Joffrey Lauvergne
  John Linehan
  Timothé Luwawu-Cabarrot
  Ian Mahinmi
  Marko Milič
  Bo McCalebb
  Conrad McRae †
  Sammy Mejia
  Jérôme Moïso
  Robert Monclar
  Gheorghe Mureșan
   François Németh
  Carl Nicks
  Frank Ntilikina
  Hugues Occansey
  Stéphane Ostrowski
  Tony Parker
  Žarko Paspalj
  Johan Petro
  Jean Perniceni
  Jacques Perrier
  Mickaël Piétrus
  Florent Piétrus
  Micheal Ray Richardson
  J.R. Reid
  Antoine Rigaudeau
  Stéphane Risacher
  David Rivers
  Delaney Rudd
  Marc Salyers
  Thabo Sefolosha
  Will Solomon
  Blake Schilb
  Laurent Sciarra
  Kevin Séraphin
  Moustapha Sonko
  Jean-Pierre Staelens
  Philip Szanyiel
  Axel Toupane
  Ronny Turiaf
  Mirsad Türkcan
  Roko Ukić
  Graylin Warner
  Frédéric Weis
  Léo Westermann
  Rickie Winslow
  Michael Young

Players with the most French League championships won

French basketball clubs in European and worldwide competitions

Individual awards

In each Pro A season, individual honors are given to players and head coaches in the Pro A Awards ceremony who performed well during a given season. The awards that are handed out include:

Most Valuable Player
Finals MVP
Best Young Player
Best Scorer
Best Sixth Man
Best Defender
Most Improved Player
Best Coach

LNB All-Star Game

See also
 Leaders Cup
 French Basketball Cup
 Match des Champions (basketball)
 LNB Pro B
 Ligue Féminine de Basketball

Notes and references

External links
Official website
Eurobasket.com League Page

 

 
1
 
Professional sports leagues in France

ca:Lliga francesa de bàsquet
de:Ligue Nationale de Basket (Frankreich)
es:Liga Nacional de Baloncesto de Francia
eu:Frantziako saskibaloi liga
it:Ligue Nationale de Basket-ball
lv:Francijas Nacionālā basketbola līga
lt:LNB
ja:リーグ・ナショナル・バスケットボール
pl:Pro A (koszykówka)
fi:Ligue Nationale de Basketball
tr:Ligue Nationale de Basketball